Interstate 110 (I-110) is a  auxiliary route of the Interstate Highway System in Pensacola, Florida, extending north from U.S. Route 98 (US 98) to I-10. I-110 carries the hidden Florida Department of Transportation designation of State Road 8A. The easternmost auxiliary route of I-10, it is also known as the Reubin O'Donovan Askew Parkway in honor of the former governor of Florida who originated in Pensacola.

Route description
I-110 consists of six interchanges. Unlike most Florida Interstates, it retained its sequential exit numbering system when others switched to a mile-log system.

The freeway begins at exits 1A through 1C, composing a directional T interchange that connects I-110 to Gregory Street, Chase Street (US 98), and Garden Street (US 98 Business) adjacent to the Pensacola Bay Center. I-110 is elevated on separate viaducts for northbound and southbound lanes throughout this initial  span through downtown Pensacola.

North of exit 3, the freeway is built at-grade, and there are two modified diamond interchanges. The first is exit 4, leading to Fairfield Drive (SR 295). Both northbound ramps of exit 4 are located in the southeast quadrant of the intersection and directly connect to Davis Highway (SR 291).

I-110's northern terminus is at I-10. There is a modified trumpet/semi-directional T interchange at this location with additional direct connections to SR 291.

History
I-110 was completed between I-10 and SR 295/Fairfield Drive by 1965. An extension south to Maxwell Street was completed in 1969. In 1978, I-110 was further extended south to its current terminus in Downtown Pensacola. The original freeway was four lanes for its entirety and connected to I-10 via an unmodified trumpet interchange.

In the 1990s, there was official discussion of extending I-110 north to US 90 Alternate (Nine Mile Road) and possibly as far as I-65 in southwestern Alabama. However, political and financial hurdles stalled serious consideration of the project. The link was later cancelled.

Between 2004 and 2009, I-110 was rebuilt and expanded to a minimum of six lanes between I-10 and Maxwell Street. Reconstruction of the freeway included access to and from Airport Boulevard via a modification of the existing Brent Lane interchange. The interchange with I-10 was rebuilt to include new flyover ramps to I-10 eastbound and from I-10 westbound, as well as direct connections to and from SR 291.

Originally, north of SR 750/Airport Boulevard, there was an overpass for SR 742 along Burgess Road. In 2006, SR 742 was rerouted along a new, wider overpass at Creighton Road, and the Burgess Road overpass was demolished.

Exit list

See also

References

External links

 Official site

10-1 Florida
10-1
1 Florida
Roads in Escambia County, Florida
1969 establishments in Florida